Igor Vladimirovich Rybakov (born 16 May 1972 in Magnitogorsk) is a meta-entrepreneur who co-owns the Technonikol industrial corporation and the Prytek technology corporation. He  appeared on Forbes's 2021 list of the world's wealthiest people with a net worth of $2 billion. He is an author, actor, showman, singer, and producer. His motto is: “What we dwell on is who we become.”

Rybakov is a philanthropist who focuses on education. Forbes calls the Rybakov Prize, established by Rybakov and his wife, Ekaterina Rybakova, the “Nobel Prize in Education”. Igor and Ekaterina Rybakov's main focus and passion has been the improvement of education in Russia and around the world. To coordinate their efforts and advance in this area, they founded the non-profit Rybakov Family Foundation in 2015.

Biography

Early career 
In 1988, while still in high school, Rybakov earned 1,400 Soviet rubles by working with a student construction brigade, which at the time was comparable to the annual salary of an engineer.

First company 
In 1992, he founded Technonikol with his classmate Sergei Kolesnikov. In November 2018, Rybakov and Kolesnikov won the 2018 EY Entrepreneur Of The Year™ Award in Russia. They attended the gala awards ceremony in Monaco in June 2019.

Children 
In 2000, Igor and Ekaterina Rybakov's daughter, Polina, was born.

Writing 
In 2017, Thirst—a business philosophy by Rybakov—was published and won PwC's Business Book of the Year in Russia award in 2018.

Forbes Ranking 
In 2015, Rybakov was included for the first time in the Forbes rankings with a $450 million net worth.

Music 
In 2019, Bloomberg reported the release of Rybakov's first music album Summer Has Been Going Away (Russian: «Уходило лето»).

Film career 
In 2019, he produced a short film "Fair Play".

Fundraising for his Alma Mater 
In January 2020, the billionaire created an endowment for his home school #56 with a $1 million donation. Rybakov said, “I am a grateful graduate of my school #56 and I want to complete my lesson at school, to give my eternal human thanks!”

Philanthropy and legacy 
Rybakov believes that every successful, accomplished person in society has the obligation and responsibility to share their experience and knowledge with others. Forbes calls Rybakov Prize the “Nobel Prize in Education”. The purpose of this award, established by Igor and Ekaterina Rybakov, is to highlight the role models of entrepreneurs, patrons, and philanthropists—all of those who take the initiative to establish schools not only as sources of knowledge but also as a vibrant center for local communities and their development. The Rybakov Prize “grand prize” award is $1 million. On February 2, 2020, at the Rybakov Prize Award Ceremony, Igor and Ekaterina Rybakov joined the Education Pledge —- an international community of philanthropists in the field of education. They signed a personal pledge to spend 100 million dollars in the next ten years on education improvement projects in Russia and around the world.

Social entrepreneurship and communities 
As active social entrepreneurs, the Rybakov family interacts with international organizations such as UNESCO and the World Bank. Rybakov prioritizes early childhood education. UNICEF has designated the catastrophic weakness of preschool education as one of its global priorities, and estimates that about half of all young children in the world do not have access to pre-primary education.  A separate issue is a lack of private impact investors in this area which Rybakov covers in his social entrepreneurship activities. Another key element of the Rybakov family's approach is their focus on self-developing communities formed around their educational projects, which makes programs and projects more effective and sustainable in the long term. The efficiency of transferring and preserving experience greatly increases in the presence of such communities.

Social entrepreneurship 
The Rybakov Preschool is a project to create an international network of kindergartens and preschools that emphasises new forms of early childhood education. The program is based on the approach recommended by the UNICEF Education Development Bureau. Rybakov Preschool establishes a conducive learning environment in their preschools and provides continual special training for their teachers. This combination of factors develops the child's independence, focus, ability to handle stress, motivation for success, ability to control themselves, and persist to a project's completion.

The Rybakov X10 ACADEMY is centered around entrepreneurs and the course “Entrepreneur Yourself!” from X10 ACADEMY and billionaire Igor Rybakov, which was rated #4 in the “most popular courses on Coursera among learners from Russia in 2019.” Also, “Entrepreneur Yourself!” was included in the TOP 10 most popular global courses launched in 2019 (per the aggregate data for 2019 from the Coursera online education service).

Media 
Igor Rybakov is the world's first billionaire who also creates video blogs. He sees direct access to an online audience as a way to pass on the skills and practices that made him successful to as many people as possible. He shares his business experience and secrets of successful entrepreneurial thinking. As of June 2020, his YouTube channel has over 750 thousand subscribers. He also has 630 thousand followers on Instagram.

"Billionaire's Thoughts" is the flagship show of Rybakov's YouTube channel where he hosts weekly guests from trending news stories and shares his thoughts on the most pressing issues of the week.

"Rybakov Talks" is a special format for meetings and discussing the future of education.”

Thirst is Rybakov’s first book, which won PwC’s Business Book of the Year in Russia award in 2018. It focuses on Rybakov’s business philosophy illustrated by the story of Technonicol’s creation.

Social art practice 
In April 2020, Rybakov announced that he would sponsor a monument to the heroic healthcare workers treating COVID-19. The project’s is funded by Rybakov and artist Alexey Sergienko. They believe the modern medical industry cannot have just the protective, auxiliary function. Rybakov and Sergienko want to bring to the world’s attention that after the pandemic, the medical industry has become the most important industry to shape humanity, and each healthcare employee today is a new type of hero. Pediatrician Leonid Roshal was one of the contest judges for the best monument.

In November 2019, there was a private opening for the most expensive art object in Russia—the Money Throne X10. A glass throne with a million dollars is exhibited at the Museum of Emotions in Moscow. The throne was made of heavy-duty glass and filled with a million dollars by Sergienko and Rybakov. According to its creators, the Money Throne inspires people to increase their wealth and create socioeconomics where everyone is a beneficiary.

In 2019, Bloomberg reported the release of Rybakov’s first music album Summer Has Been Going Away. According to Rybakov, music is a universal language that makes it possible to communicate certain experiences and conditions that conventional languages simply cannot, and as it is universal, it does not require translation. “Music stimulates intellectual activity that helps me to search and discover new business opportunities,” Rybakov said in a phone interview for Bloomberg.

Business 
Igor Rybakov is a meta-entrepreneur. His approach is based on venture financing models to invest in industrial and technology companies and grow socioeconomic ecosystems on a global level out of them. Rybakov believes that formats of organizing technology business as Silicon Valley will be replaced by new formats like multinational platforms that generate business ecosystems around them. Prytek Technology Corporation, where Rybakov is one of the main beneficiaries, is one of the examples of how he implements this vision.

In 2019, Technonicol Corporation had $1.7 billion (103.7 billion rubles) in revenue. The corporation has 53 manufacturing facilities in 7 countries (Russia, Belarus, Lithuania, Czech Republic, Italy, Great Britain, Germany), 22 offices in 18 countries, 18 training centers, and 6 research centers. It was founded in 1992 by Rybakov and his classmate Kolesnikov. The business started as a trading company: young entrepreneurs purchased raw materials, delivered them to factories, and resold products produced at affiliate factories. The first office in Moscow opened in 1993. From 1994 to 1999, they expanded into the various regions of Russia, as well as the other CIS countries. Today, the company has 90 sales offices in Russia and the CIS countries; its product line offers more than 20,000 unique items. The company's products can be purchased in 150 countries. In November 2018, Rybakov and Kolesnikov won the 2018 EY Entrepreneur Of The Year™ Award in Russia. They attended the gala awards ceremony in Monaco in June 2019 together. From 2010 to 2018, TECHNONICOL doubled its productivity. In 2019, Technonicol was included in the top 200 largest Russian private companies Forbes and was ranked at 114th place.

Family 
Igor Rybakov and his wife Ekaterina have four children. Ekaterina heads the family's charity, the Rybakov Foundation. Ekaterina notes: “Many people do not understand why I, the wife of a well-off husband, am engaged in the affairs of the Foundation. In my opinion, financial well-being and the satisfaction of material needs do not provide a sense of a full and meaningful life. Perhaps such a lifestyle suits someone else but it’s definitely not for me.”

Igor and Ekaterina Rybakov decided not to leave an inheritance to their children and chose to donate their capital to charitable causes. Igor Rybakov says, “We want to leave our children a legacy, not an inheritance.” Ekaterina Rybakova adds, “We don’t want to deprive our children of the opportunity to discover themselves in life. This is our parental message that we believe in them, that they are capable and talented enough to build their own life path. Children are as prepared for the future as they are prepared to respond to uncertainty. Our children probably have not yet had the opportunity to prove themselves in such situations. But children learn about life not only from their own experience but also by observing role models. And we educate our children not so much through our parental instructions as by our own example—we, the adults, become the role models for our children, the future adults. We try to be proactively adaptive, that is, we interact with the environment to improve it for ourselves and for others.”

According to Ekaterina, at some point, she and Igor realized that their family had entered a new stage. Igor delegated the daily operational management of his business, their children grew up, and the couple had the opportunity to focus on something other than business and family.

Ekaterina commented in interviews that she and Igor were intuitively looking for schools for their children with a community built around them—graduates, parents, partners, and friends.

Ekaterina says, “I now begin to understand that money is not only an opportunity but also a responsibility. Through his business, Igor managed to accumulate certain capital, and I think of it in a way that the society trusted us to manage this money wisely: if you were able to attract money — be able to use it.” Ekaterina describes money as only a tool, and that the highest purpose and enlightenment of an individual is to pass on their values and knowledge to other people and future generations who will be able to do better than the previous ones.

Ekaterina Rybakova - the president and cofounder of the Rybakov Foundation has become a laureate of the National Award "Media Manager of Russia - 2020" as the ideologist and the founder of the PRO Women's community. Ekaterina develops projects in the social and education sphere together with her husband Igor Rybakov. At a certain moment, Ekaterina and Igor Rybakov decided to devote the second half of their lives to returning capital in a transformed form to society.

References

Links 
 

1972 births
Russian venture capitalists
Russian billionaires
Living people
Moscow Institute of Physics and Technology alumni